The UWA World Trios Championship is a tag team professional wrestling championship created by the Mexican Universal Wrestling Association and defended there until the UWA closed in 1995. Since then, the championship has been defended in various promotions in Japan.

As it is a professional wrestling championship, the championship is not won not by actual competition, but by a scripted ending to a match determined by the bookers and match makers. On occasion the promotion declares a championship vacant, which means there is no champion at that point in time. This can either be due to a storyline, or real life issues such as a champion suffering an injury being unable to defend the championship, or leaving the company.

The current champions are Aagan Iisou (Shuji Kondo, Takuya Sugawara and Toru Owashi).

History
After the UWA's closing, the title was inactive for many years before being recycled as trios belts for the Toryumon Japan promotion. The titles fell back into disrepair due to Último Dragón leaving Toryumon and taking the name with him, causing the then-Toryumon workers to create Dragon Gate, where they created new belts for the new company. After leaving Toryumon Japan, the titles ended up in the hands of its descendant promotion El Dorado and the Mexico based Toryumon Gym. Neither group promoted shows on a regular basis, which produced two unsuccessful attempts to relaunch the championship. In 2007, El Dorado revived the title again. In 2008 El Dorado Wrestling folded and the title moved to DDT Pro-Wrestling, where it was active until 2012, the final champions were Harashima, Toru Owashi and Yukihiro Abe. On August 30, 2015, it was announced that the title would be revived by the Wrestle-1 promotion on October 9. The title has since moved to Big Japan Pro Wrestling and DDT's Pro-Wrestling Basara sub-group.

Reigns

Combined reigns

By wrestler 

{|class="wikitable sortable" style="text-align: center"
!Rank
!Wrestler
!data-sort-type="number"|No. ofreigns
!data-sort-type="number"|Combineddays	
|-
!1
|style="background-color:#ffe6bd"| Toru Owashi † || 4 || style="background-color:#bbeeff"|¤+
|-
!2
|style="background-color:#ffe6bd"| Takuya Sugawara † || 3 || +
|-
!3
|style="background-color:#ffe6bd"| Shuji Kondo † || 6 || +
|-
!rowspan=2|4
| El Signo || 5 || style="background-color:#bbeeff"|841¤
|-
| Negro Navarro || 6 || style="background-color:#bbeeff"|841¤
|-
!6
| Nosawa Rongai || 6 || 655
|-
!7
| Black Power II || 2 || 611
|-
!rowspan=3|8
| El Brazo || 3 || style="background-color:#bbeeff"|572¤
|-
| Brazo de Oro || 3 || style="background-color:#bbeeff"|572¤
|-
| Brazo de Plata || 3 || style="background-color:#bbeeff"|572¤
|-
!11
| Minoru Fujita/Fujita || 4 || 528
|-
!rowspan=3|12
| Villano I || 5 || style="background-color:#bbeeff"|500¤
|-
| Villano IV || 5 || style="background-color:#bbeeff"|500¤
|-
| Villano V || 5 || style="background-color:#bbeeff"|500¤
|-
!rowspan=3|15
| Billyken Kid || 1 || 496
|-
| Masamune || 1 || 496
|-
| Tsubasa || 1 || 496
|-
!rowspan=2|18
| Cima || 4 || 490
|-
| Big Fujii || 4 || 490
|-
!20
| Masada || 3 || 465
|-
!rowspan=3|21
| Mango Fukuda || 1 || 385
|-
| Pineapple Hanai || 1 || 385
|-
| Takeshi Minamino || 1 || 385
|-
!rowspan=3|24
| Francesco Togo || 1 || 335
|-
| Piza Michinoku || 1 || 335
|-
| Antonio Honda || 1 || 335
|-
!27
| Yassini/"brother" Yasshi || 2 || 312
|-
!28
| Suwa || 3 || 247
|-
!29
| Taru || 1 || 243
|-
!rowspan=3|30
| Seiki Yoshioka || 3 || 223
|-
| Scorpio Jr. || 3 || 223
|-
| Shu El Guerrero || 3 || 223
|-
!33
| Kaz Hayashi || 3 || 216
|-
!34
| El Engendro || 2 || 216
|-
!35
| Nobutaka Araya || 1 || 209
|-
!rowspan=3|36
| Kahoz || 2 || 197
|-
| Rambo || 2 || 197
|-
| Zandokan || 2 || 197
|-
!39
| Dragon Kid || 3 || 194
|-
!40
| Andy Wu || 3 || 189
|-
!rowspan=2|41
| Minoru Tanaka || 1 || 180
|-
| Tajiri || 1 || 180
|-
!rowspan=2|43
| Koji Doi || 4 || 179
|-
| Daiki Inaba || 2 || 179
|-
!45
| Kumagoro || 4 || 169
|-
!46
| Hikaru Sato || 3 || 151
|-
!rowspan=2|47
| Brahman Kei || 1 || 142
|-
| Brahman Shu || 1 || 142
|-
!49
| Jiro Kuroshio || 4 || 137
|-
!50
| Masaaki Mochizuki || 3 || 134
|-
!51
| Susumu Yokosuka || 3 ||| 127
|-
!52
| Manabu Soya || 2 || 121
|-
!rowspan=2|55
| Kenichiro Arai || 2 || 119
|-
| Ryo Saito || 2 || 119
|-
!rowspan=3|53
| Daiki Shimomura || 2 || 118
|-
| Isami Kodaka † || 2 || 118
|-
| Rocky Santana || 1 || 118
|-
!rowspan=3|58
| Takato Nakano || 1 || 105
|-
| Takumi Tsukamoto || 1 || 105
|-
| Yasu Urano || 1 || 105
|-
!61
| Takanori Ito || 1 || 102
|-
!rowspan=3|62
| Great Kojika || 1 || 101
|-
| Riho || 1 || 101
|-
| Mr. #6 || 1 || 101
|-
!65
| Ganseki Tanaka || 1 || 92
|-
!66
| Yusuke Kodama || 2 || 88
|-
!67
| Darkness Dragon || 2 || 83
|-style="background-color:#bbeeff"
!rowspan=2|68
| Milano Collection A.T. || 2 || 80¤
|-style="background-color:#bbeeff"
| Yossino || 2 || 80¤
|-
!rowspan=2|70
| Jun Kasai || 1 || 75
|-
| Magnum Tokyo || 1 || 75
|-
!72
| Yasufumi Nakanoue || 2 || 66
|-
!rowspan=3|73
| Akiyori Takizawa || 1 || 58
|-
| Naoki Tanizaki || 1 || 58
|-
| Ryota Nakatsu || 1 || 58
|-
!rowspan=2|76
| Danshoku Dino || 1 || 56
|-
| Masa Takanashi || 1 || 56
|-
!78
|Ryuichi Sekine || 1 || 55
|-
!rowspan=3|79
| Fatu || 1 || 54
|-
| Great Kokina || 1 || 54
|-
| The Samoan Savage || 1 || 54
|-
!rowspan=2|82
| Michael Nakazawa || 1 || 53
|-
| Tomomitsu Matsunaga || 1 || 53
|-
!rowspan=2|84
| Kohei Fujimura || 1 || 46
|-
| Yusuke Kodama || 1 || 46
|-
!86
| Genki Horiguchi || 1 || 44
|-
!rowspan=4|87
| Shotaro Ashino || 1 || 42
|-
| Seigo Tachibana || 1 || 42
|-
| Keisuke Ishii || 1 || 42
|-
| Yoshihiko || 1 || 42
|-
!rowspan=2|91
| Hub || 1 || 36
|-
| Ultimate Spider Jr. || 1 || 36
|-
!rowspan=4|93
| Atsushi Kotoge || 1 || 28
|-
| Daisuke Harada || 1 || 28
|-
| Second Doi || 1 || 28
|-
| Takoyakida || 1 || 28
|-
!97
| Jay Freddie || 1 || 14
|-
!98
| Yasushi Kanda || 1 || 11
|-
!99
| Masayuki Kono || 1 || 7
|-
!rowspan=3|100
| Ebessan  || 1 || 6
|-
| Kanjyuro Matsuyama || 1 || 6
|-
| Kuishinbo Kamen || 1 || 6
|-style="background-color:#bbeeff"
!rowspan=12|103
|Black Man || 1 || 
|-style="background-color:#bbeeff"
| Gedo || 1 || 
|-style="background-color:#bbeeff"
| Harashima || 1 || 
|-style="background-color:#bbeeff"
| Jado || 1 || 
|-style="background-color:#bbeeff"
| Katsushi Takemura || 1 || 
|-style="background-color:#bbeeff"
| Kato Kung Lee || 1 || 
|-style="background-color:#bbeeff"
| Kung Fu || 1 || 
|-style="background-color:#bbeeff"
| Yukihiro Abe || 1 || 
|-

Footnotes

References

Trios wrestling tag team championships
Universal Wrestling Association championships
El Dorado Wrestling championships
DDT Pro-Wrestling championships
Wrestle-1 championships
Big Japan Pro Wrestling championships
World professional wrestling championships
Toryumon championships
Pro-Wrestling Basara championships